The State Academic University for the Humanities (GAUGN former GUGN) is a public higher education institution, based on the individual institutes of the Russian Academy of Sciences. It originally bore the name Russian Center of Liberal Education (RTSGO), State University of Humanities (GUGN). The director: Aleksandr Chubaryan, member of the Russian Academy of Sciences.
GAUGN is best known for its integration of academic science into university educational process by collaborating with prominent Russian scholars.

Mission
The mission of GAUGN is to install the academic culture, provide the information management with skills in order to be able to change career map throughout your life. It is the place for communication of intellectual elite, the development of international, cultural and scientific communication, the research of social problems, the study and preservation of historical and cultural heritage, the development and implementation of new educational technologies.

History
On April 13, 1992, the council of ministers signed Decree №244 on the establishment of the National Center for Humanitarian Education. Another possible date of birth of the university can be considered the date of signing the Order of the Government of the Russian Federation dated 24 February 1994, when the center was given the status of a university. The date of birth of the third high school is August 21, 1998, when RTSGO (University) was renamed the Order of the Ministry of Education of Russia №2208 in State University of Humanities received one of the modern titles.

Faculties
Faculty of philosophy
Faculty of political science
Faculty of psychology
Faculty of history
Faculty of law
Faculty of cultural studies
Faculty of world politics
Faculty of sociology
Faculty of economics
Faculty of economic management
Faculty of oriental studies
Institute of books culture and management

External links 

  
  English site of the University

Educational institutions established in 1994
State Academic University for the Humanities
1994 establishments in Russia